Michalis Giannouzakos (born 1949) is a retired Greek professional basketball player and basketball coach.

Playing career

Club playing career
Giannouzakos began playing club basketball with the Greek club HAN Thessaloniki (YMCA) in 1964. He moved to  AEK Athens in 1974. He then joined Aris in 1981.

National team career
Giannouzakos was a member of the senior men's Greek national basketball team. With Greece's senior men's national team, he had 147 caps, and he scored 956 points (6.5 points per game). With Greece's senior men's team, he played at the 1972 Pre-Olympic Tournament, the EuroBasket 1973, the EuroBasket 1975, and the EuroBasket 1979.

Coaching career
After he retired from his playing career, Giannouzakos became a basketball coach. 
During the 2018-2019 season coach Gianouzakos joined Aetos B.C., a team that plays in thessaloniki's amateur C1 league. Coaching rising stars Taxiarhis Papaevangellou, Alex Tsiro, Durex, Marios Lagos and Mitso Palla.

References

External links
FIBA Profile
FIBA Europe Profile
Hellenic Basketball Federation Profile 

1949 births
Living people
AEK B.C. players
Aris B.C. players
Greek basketball coaches
Greek men's basketball players
HANTH B.C. players
Iraklis Thessaloniki B.C. coaches
Power forwards (basketball)
Small forwards
Competitors at the 1971 Mediterranean Games
Mediterranean Games bronze medalists for Greece
Mediterranean Games medalists in basketball